The Stowe Breviary (British Library, Stowe MS 12) is an early-fourteenth-century illuminated manuscript Breviary from England, providing the divine office according to the Sarum ordinal and calendar (with Norwich additions).

It is thought to be by the same scribe as the Macclesfield Psalter and the Douai Psalter. The manuscript forms part of the Stowe manuscripts in the British Library.

Sources
Sherry Reames, "Origins and Affiliations of the Pre-Sarum Office for Anne in the Stowe Breviary", in Music and Medieval Manuscripts: Paleography and Performance, Essays Dedicated to Andrew Hughes, ed. John Haines and Randall Rosenfeld (Aldershot: Ashgate, 2004), pp. 349–68.

External links
British Library catalogue record

14th-century illuminated manuscripts
Breviary
Illuminated breviaries